Rahman Dadman (1956–2001) was an Iranian politician. Trained as a civil engineer Dadman briefly served as the minister of roads and transportation between January and May 2001. He died in a plane crash on 17 May 2001.

Biography
Dadman was born in Ardabil in 1956. He received a bachelor's degree in civil engineering from the University of Tehran in 1983. He also obtained a master of science degree in the same field from the same institution in 1986. Dadman held a PhD again in civil engineering which he received from the University of Manchester in 1996. Before the 1979 revolution Dadman was part of the revolutionaries. 

Dadman worked at his alma mater, University of Tehran, as a faculty member. He was appointed minister of roads and transportation under President Mohammad Khatami on 14 January 2001. On 17 May 2001 he died in an air accident with about 30 other passengers in the crash of an Iranian Yak-40 plane, 13 miles from the city of Sari, Iran, in northern Iran.

Dadman was married to Zohratalsadat Nazari who was one of the individuals involved in the capture of the US Embassy in Tehran in November 1979. They had four children. One of his children, Ali Dadman, died on 27 June 2016 under mysterious conditions.

References

External links

20th-century Iranian engineers
20th-century Iranian politicians
21st-century Iranian engineers
1956 births
2001 deaths
Burials at Behesht-e Zahra
Government ministers of Iran
Iranian civil engineers
Islamic Iran Participation Front politicians
Muslim Student Followers of the Imam's Line
People from Ardabil
University of Tehran alumni
Victims of aviation accidents or incidents in Iran
Alumni of the University of Manchester
Academic staff of the University of Tehran